The Aomori International LGBT Film Festival (青森インターナショナルLGBTフィルムフェスティバル) has been held annually in Aomori Prefecture since July 2006 and focuses on diverse representations of gender. It is held at the five-story Auga in the city of Aomori.

Films Shown 
2006 (1st year), from July 29

 Tying the Knot (US, 2004)
 chocolate (Japan, 2000)
 Himawari (Japan, 2004)
 Hete kuchigusuri (Japan, 2005)
 Straight Out: Stories from Iceland (Iceland, 2003)

2007 (2nd year), from July 21

 Until the Moon Waxes (Japan, 2007)
 Hands (Japan, 2005)

2008 (3rd year) from July 27

 Dangerous Living: Coming Out in the Developing World (US, 2005)
 The Times of Harvey Milk (US, 1984)

2009 (4th year) from July 25

 Follow My Voice: With the Music of Hedwig (US, 2006)
 Eternal Summer (Taiwan, 2006)
 When I Become Silent (Japan, 2007)

2010 (5th year) from July 3

 Mariko Rose, the Spook (Japan, 2009)
 Paragraph 175 (US, 2000)
 Love of Siam (Thailand, 2007)

2011 (6th year) from July 3

 Shimijimi aruiteru (Japan, 2010)
 Spring Fever (China/France, 2009)

2012 (7th year)

 Pyuupiru 20011-2008 (Japan, 2009)
 Boku no koi, Kare no himitsu (Japan, 2004)
 Coming Out Story

2013 (8th year) from July 20

 Cloudburst (US/Canada, 2011)
 Loose Cannons (Italy, 2010)
 Yuriko, Dasvidaniya (Japan, 2011)

2014 (9th year) from July 13

 Call Me Kuchu (US, 2012)
 Tsuyako (US, 2011)
 Esora (Japan, 2013)
 Boku no Naka no Otoko no Musume (Japan, 2012)

Festivals in Aomori Prefecture
LGBT film festivals in Japan